Butterwick is a hamlet in Cumbria, England, near the village of Helton.

Location grid

Hamlets in Cumbria
Bampton, Cumbria